Penicillium vagum is a species of fungus in the genus Penicillium which was isolated from an air sample in the Stellenbosch Mountains in Western Cape in South Africa.

References

vagum
Fungi described in 2014